Phymatodes aereus is a species of beetle in the family Cerambycidae. It was described by Newman in 1838.

References

Phymatodes
Beetles described in 1838